Cushnie may refer to:

People 
Carl Cushnie, businessman from the United Kingdom
Carly Cushnie, founder with Michelle Ochs of American fashion house Cushnie et Ochs
John Cushnie (1943–2009), landscape designer, author, journalist, and broadcaster on the BBC Radio 4 programme Gardeners' Question Time
Mykal Cushnie (born 1980), Jamaican film director, film producer and editor
David Gordon Allen d’Aldecamb Lumsden of Cushnie, FSAL, FSAS (1933–2008), Scottish businessman, nationalist and sometime Baron

Places 
 Cushnie, Queensland, a locality in the South Burnett Region, Australia
 Leochel-Cushnie, a parish in Aberdeenshire

See also

Cushi